Blue Mountains National Forest was established as the Blue Mountains Forest Reserve by the U.S. Forest Service in Oregon on March 15, 1906 with  from portions of the Baker City Forest Reserve and other lands.  It became a National Forest on March 4, 1907. On March 2, 1908 Maury Mountain Forest Reserve was added to Blue Mountains, and on July 1, 1911 the forest was divided among Whitman, Malheur, Umatilla and Deschutes National Forests and the name was discontinued.

References

External links
Forest History Society
Listing of the National Forests of the United States and Their Dates (from Forest History Society website) Text from Davis, Richard C., ed. Encyclopedia of American Forest and Conservation History. New York: Macmillan Publishing Company for the Forest History Society, 1983. Vol. II, pp. 743-788.

Former National Forests of Oregon
1906 establishments in Oregon
Protected areas established in 1906
1911 disestablishments in Oregon